Luciano Germán Vella (born April 13, 1981) is a retired Argentine footballer who played as a right-back.

Career
He started playing football for his home town club Newell's Old Boys. He transferred to then La Liga club Cádiz CF in January 2006. He endured a rather unsuccessful spell in Spain with Cádiz relegated after the 2005–06 season. They were then unable to bounce back the following season (finishing 5th), and with the club looking to miss promotion again half-way through the 2007–08 season, Vella returned to Argentina with Vélez Sársfield for the start of the 2008 Clausura championship. On 10 June 2010 Newell's Old Boys loaned the 29-year-old right wingback from Club Atlético Independiente.

Honours
Newell's Old Boys
Primera División: 2004 Apertura
River Plate
Primera B Nacional: 2011–12

External links
 Bdfa profile
 Argentine Primera statistics
 Soccerway profile
 Romaniansoccer profile

1981 births
Living people
Footballers from Rosario, Santa Fe
Argentine footballers
Association football defenders
Newell's Old Boys footballers
Cádiz CF players
Club Atlético Vélez Sarsfield footballers
FC Rapid București players
Club Atlético Independiente footballers
Club Atlético River Plate footballers
Unión de Santa Fe footballers
Argentine Primera División players
La Liga players
Liga I players
Expatriate footballers in Romania
Expatriate footballers in Spain
Argentine expatriate sportspeople in Spain
Argentine expatriate footballers
Argentine expatriate sportspeople in Romania
Argentine people of Maltese descent